Leonardo da Vinci this name has been borne by at least four ships of the Italian Navy and may refer to:

 , a  launched in 1911 and sunk in 1916.
 , a  launched in 1939 and sunk in 1943.
 , a  launched in 1942 as USS Dace for the United States Navy and transferred in 1955. She was returned in 1972.
 , a  launched in 1979 and decommissioned in 2010.

Italian Navy ship names